The 2020 African Judo Championships took place in Antananarivo, Madagascar, from 17 to 20 December 2020.

The championships were originally scheduled to be held in Casablanca from 16 to 19 April, then in Rabat from 28 to 30 November, but were postponed both times due to the COVID-19 pandemic.

Medal overview

Men

Women

Team

Medal table

References

External links
 

2020
African Judo Championships
African Judo Championships
International sports competitions hosted by Madagascar
African Judo Championships
Sports events postponed due to the COVID-19 pandemic